The 12th Pan American Games were held in Mar del Plata, Argentina from March 11 to March 26, 1995.

Results by event

See also
Guyana at the 1996 Summer Olympics

References

Nations at the 1995 Pan American Games
Pan American Games
1995